Mordellistena luteispina is a beetle in the genus Mordellistena of the family Mordellidae. It was described in 1977 by Karl Friedrich Ermisch.

References

luteispina
Beetles described in 1977